Events in the year 1892 in Portugal.

Incumbents
Monarch: Carlos I 
President of the Council of Ministers: João Crisóstomo de Abreu e Sousa (until 17 January), José Dias Ferreira (from 17 January)

Events
 17 June - Establishment of the Count of Idanha-a-Nova title of nobility 
 23 October - Legislative election

Culture
 Só (poem collection)

Births
 22 January - João Sassetti, fencer (died 1946)
 21 May - José Adriano Pequito Rebelo, writer, politician, aviator (died 1983)
 17 August - António Botto, aesthete, modernist poet (died 1959 in Brazil)
 4 September - Sarmento de Beires, Army officer, aviation pioneer (died 1974)
 4 October - Moisés Bensabat Amzalak, scholar, economist (died 1978)
 5 October - Paulo Bénard Guedes, 127th Governor-General of Portuguese India (died 1960 in Angola)
 26 December - Lomelino Silva, singer (died 1967)
 José María Sá Lemos, sculptor (died 1971)

Deaths
 José Maria da Ponte e Horta, noble, colonial administrator, soldier (born 1824)

See also
List of colonial governors in 1892#Portugal

References

 
Years of the 19th century in Portugal
Portugal